The 1943 All-Ireland Senior Camogie Championship was the high point of the 1943 season in Camogie. The championship was won by Dublin, who defeated Cork by a 20-point margin in the final. The match was played at Croke Park, Dublin.

Final
Dublin goalkeeper Peggy Hogg was forced to withdraw through illness on the morning of the match.

Aftermath
Elizabeth Mulcahy, who scored the opening goal for Dublin, was to become one of Ireland's foremost fashion designers.

Final stages

 
 Match Rules
50 minutes
Replay if scores level
Maximum of 3 substitutions

See also
 All-Ireland Senior Hurling Championship
 Wikipedia List of Camogie players
 National Camogie League
 Camogie All Stars Awards
 Ashbourne Cup

References

External links
 Camogie Association
 Historical reports of All Ireland finals
 All-Ireland Senior Camogie Championship: Roll of Honour
 Camogie on facebook
 Camogie on GAA Oral History Project

1943 in camogie
1943